Revolution Revolución is the debut album by the American heavy metal band Ill Niño. It has sold over 375,000 copies in the United States.
It was the only album to feature guitarist Marc Rizzo, who left the band in 2003 to join Soulfly, and percussionist Roger Vasquez, who also left in 2003 and was replaced by Daniel Couto for the second album, Confession.

Reception
Q magazine gave the album 3 stars out of 5 and said, "South American nu-metal with a strong Latin undercurrent... frontman Christian Marchado is equally adept at venting his spleen in English and Spanish." Allmusic gave the album 3 stars out of 5 and said, "This is an excellent debut for fans who lean more to the cerebral side of modern metallic endeavors."

Track listing
All songs by Cristian Machado, Marc Rizzo and Dave Chavarri.

 The album was re-released on October 22, 2002. Two multimedia tracks were also included:
 "What Comes Around" (Videoclip)
 "Unreal" (Videoclip)

The track "Liar" is played in the credits of the game Ghost Recon Advanced Warfighter for the Xbox 360.

Credits

Ill Niño
Cristian Machado ― vocals; additional samples
Jardel Martins Paisante ― guitar
Marc Rizzo ― guitar
Lazaro Pina ― bass
Roger Vasquez ― percussion
Dave Chavarri ― drums; additional samples

Additional personnel
DJ Skratch ― turntables
Omar Clavijo ― programming, samples
Krztoff ― keyboards, synths
Mark Hunter (musician) ― additional vocals (track 15)

References

2001 debut albums
Ill Niño albums
Roadrunner Records albums